Henry Goode Blasdel (January 20, 1825 – July 26, 1900) was an American politician and a member of the Republican Party. He was the first Governor of Nevada, serving during the American Civil War and the first years of the Reconstruction era.

Biography
Blasdel was born on January 20, 1825, near Lawrenceburg, Indiana. He had a limited education in the common schools of his native state. He married Sarah Jane Cox and they had three children.

Career
Blasdel worked as a farmer, storekeeper and river boat captain before he came to Nevada in 1861, when he was appointed Recorder of Storey County. He served on the National Union League Committee which notified President Abraham Lincoln of his renomination.  He was active in mining and milling.

Securing the Republican gubernatorial nomination, Blasdel was elected Governor in 1864, and re-elected in 1866. During his tenure, the state government was organized, additional land was ceded to the state, plans were made for the first state capitol building, and an Indian uprising was dealt with.

After his governorship, Blasdel retired from political life and in 1891 he moved his family to Oakland, California, where he continued to be active in mining and milling.

Death
Blasdel died in his home in Oakland, California on July 26, 1900. He is interred at Mountain View Cemetery, Oakland, Alameda County, California USA.

References

External links
 
National Governors Association
Nevada Culture. Org
The Political Graveyard

1825 births
1900 deaths
Republican Party governors of Nevada
People from Lawrenceburg, Indiana
People of Nevada in the American Civil War
Methodists from Indiana
Union (American Civil War) state governors
19th-century American politicians
Methodists from Nevada